5 Is the Perfect Number is a 2019 Italian thriller drama film directed by Igort, based on his 2002 homonymous graphic novel, starring Toni Servillo and Valeria Golino.

The film was released in Italy on 29 August 2019 and presented at the Venice Days of the 76th Venice Film Festival.

Plot
In 1970s Naples, the retired camorrist Peppino Lo Cicero decides to return to action after the murder of his son Nino. Imagining that his son's death was caused by a betrayal, Peppino tries to hire four fellow hitmen in order to plan and execute his revenge.

Cast

 Toni Servillo as Peppino Lo Cicero
 Valeria Golino as Rita
 Carlo Buccirosso as Totò o' Macellaio (Totò the Butcher)
 Iaia Forte as Madonna
 Giovanni Ludeno as Il Gobbo (The Hunchback)
  as Mister Ics (Mr. X)
  as Don Guarino
  as Don Lava

 Emanuele Valenti as Ciro
 Marcello Romolo as Michele

Reception 
The film has been described as visually and stylistically appealing, yet not emotionally compelling by The Hollywood Reporter.

References

External links

5 is the Perfect Number  at Rotten Tomatoes

2019 films
2019 thriller drama films
Italian thriller films
Italian thriller drama films
2010s Italian-language films
Films set in Naples
Films set in the 1970s
Films based on Italian comics
Live-action films based on comics
2010s Italian films